Marjaniemi Lighthouse is a lighthouse located in the village of Marjaniemi at the westernmost point of Hailuoto island on the Gulf of Bothnia. The lighthouse was designed by Axel Hampus Dalström as his fourth lighthouse and it was first lit in 1872.

The tower is brick masonry, and has 110 steps inside with no intermediate floors. Originally the light was equipped with a Fresnel lens system, and it displayed a white light towards a sector clockwise from south to northeast. There were two lighthouse keepers and a master until 1962 when the lighthouse was automated. A pilot station was built next to the tower, currently the pilot station serves as a hotel.

The lighthouse also houses a smaller sector light that is used to guide vessels to and from the fishing harbour. Today the lighthouse also houses a webcam.

References

External links

Lighthouse Webcam

Lighthouses completed in 1872
Gulf of Bothnia
Lighthouses in Finland
Hailuoto
Buildings and structures in North Ostrobothnia